Acacia intricata is a shrub belonging to the genus Acacia and the subgenus Phyllodineae that is endemic to south western Australia.

Description
The erect short, straight and rigid branchlets are slightly soiny with caducous stipules and yellow ribs. It produces yellow flowers from July to September. The showy spherical flower-heads contain 7 to 13 bight-yellow to golden flowers.

Taxonomy
The species was first formally described by the botanist Spencer Le Marchant Moore in 1920 as part of the work A contribution to the Flora of Australia as published in the Journal of the Linnean Society, Botany. It was reclassified as Racosperma intricatum by Leslie Pedley in 2003 then transferred back to the genus Acacia in 2006.

Distribution
It is native to an area in the Wheatbelt and Goldfields-Esperance regions of Western Australia that is found on stony ridges, lateritic rises and undulating plain growing in sandy-clay-loam soils. The bulk of the population is found between Bencubbin in the north to around Lake Grace and Lake King as a part of mallee shrubland or open woodland communities.

See also
List of Acacia species

References

intricata
Acacias of Western Australia
Plants described in 1920